Papagaio is a Brazilian steakhouse (churrascaria) restaurant, with two locations in Israel: one in Herzliya and one in Jerusalem. Papagaio, which opened their first location in Tel Aviv in 1997, is a Brazilian steakhouse with kosher menus.

Concept 
Their best known option is an all-you-can-eat meal which for a set price includes a salad, bread and unlimited meats. Although the menu varies from day to day, most days provide at least 10-12 different types of meat to choose from. A series of waiters go from table to table with the different selections of meat, allowing diners to try every type for one flat price.

Papagaio also offers a meat sampler.

Locations
As of 2022 there are two locations around Israel:

 Herzliya
 Jerusalem

There used to be locations also in Eilat, Haifa, and Tel Aviv.

Kashrut
Both locations are certified kosher: the Jerusalem location is certified L'Mehadrin by the Orthodox Union and the Herzliya location is under the Rabbanut.

References 

Food and drink companies of Israel
Restaurant chains in Israel